Limp is an unincorporated community in Hardin County, Kentucky, United States.

A post office called Limp was established in 1884, and remained in operation until it was discontinued in 1934. Limp has been noted for its unusual place name.

References

Unincorporated communities in Hardin County, Kentucky
Unincorporated communities in Kentucky